Errol Christie (29 June 1963 – 11 June 2017) was an English professional boxer and boxing trainer. He was the captain of the English amateur boxing team from 1980 to 1983 and European amateur champion in 1983. After turning professional he was a regular fixture on ITV Fight Night in the 1980s. After retiring from boxing he became a trainer in white-collar boxing.

Career

Boxing career
Christie was born in Leicester and raised in Radford, Coventry, one of seven brothers. At the age of eight, he started boxing at the Standard-Triumph gym in Coventry managed by Tom McGarry. Out of 80 fights in his early career, Christie lost only two and gained a reputation for early knockouts. He was Warwickshire champion in 1976, schoolboy champion in 1977, NABC champion in 1979 and senior ABA champion in 1981, beating Cameron Lithgow in the final. He was appointed England boxing captain from 1980 to 1983. He moved to London in 1981 to further his boxing career.

In 1982, he became European amateur under-19 champion after defeating Assylbek Kilimov in the semi-finals and Moe Gruciano in the finals at Schwerin in what was then East Germany. Christie was listed in The Guinness Book of Records as the only British boxer to win all 10 amateur titles.

After turning professional in 1982 with new manager Burt McCarthy he won his first 13 fights, 12 inside the distance, including a victory over French champion Joel Bonnetaz in February 1984. He earned the right to wear the Kronk Gym golden shorts after impressing its promoter Emanuel Steward while sparring there. In September 1984 Jose Seys delivered a surprise knockout which shook Christie's confidence. Seven more wins followed, including a win over former Mexican champion Gonzalo Montes, before a bout with Mark Kaylor in a British middleweight title eliminator at Wembley Arena in November 1985 in which he was knocked out in the eighth round.

After winning his next four fights, beating Nigerian champion Hunter Clay and former welterweight world title challenger Sean Mannion, he suffered another setback when he was stopped by Charles Boston in December 1986. He won eight of his thirteen fights between June 1987 and October 1990, and in November 1990 faced Michael Watson at the National Exhibition Centre; Watson stopped him in the third round. Christie was out of the ring for over two years, returning in March 1993 to face Trevor Ambrose, losing after being stopped in the second round of what proved to be his final fight.

Post-boxing career
Christie had tried his hand at stand up comedy towards the end of his boxing career and after retiring from boxing in 1993 he worked as a market trader for six years.

In 1999, Christie began teaching white-collar boxers, initially at the Real Fight Club, and from 2003 at Gymbox in Holborn, London. In 2005, The Guardian and other newspapers reported an incident where one of Errol's white collar-boxing students, film distributor Simon Franks, hit Hollywood actor George Clooney at the premiere of his film Good Night, and Good Luck. An argument between the two men was alleged to have got out of control. Christie was quoted in The Guardian asking whether his student, Franks, had used his left hook. His students have included TV presenter Dermot O'Leary, former footballer Gianluca Vialli, musician Seal, and journalist Tony McMahon. He also worked with children in schools and community centres.

In 2010, Christie was taken on as the fight consultant to the play Sucker Punch written by Roy Williams and directed by Sacha Wares, performed at the Royal Court Theatre in Chelsea, London. In March 2010, Christie published his biography No Place To Hide, about racism in both the boxing game and 1970s/1980s Britain in collaboration with McMahon. The book was longlisted for the William Hill sports writer prize for 2010.

Personal life
Christie was the uncle of Cyrus Christie, a professional footballer for Hull City A.F.C. and the Irish national team.

Illness and death
In March 2015 Christie was diagnosed with small-cell lung cancer. He died at St. Christopher's Hospice in London on 11 June 2017 of complications from the disease, aged 53.

References

External links

 

Black British sportspeople
English male boxers
English people of Jamaican descent
Middleweight boxers
Sportspeople from Coventry
Boxers from Leicester
1963 births
2017 deaths
Deaths from lung cancer in England
England Boxing champions